Michael Knowles may refer to:

 Michael Knowles (actor) (born 1937), English actor and scriptwriter
 Michael Knowles (politician) (born 1942), British Conservative Member of Parliament
 Michael Knowles (film producer), English film producer
 Michael Knowles (rugby league) (born 1987), English rugby player
 Michael Knowles (political commentator) (born 1990), American author and conservative political commentator
 Michael Knowles, American film director of The Trouble with Bliss
 David Knowles (scholar) (Michael Clive Knowles, 1896–1974), English monk and scholar